Henrietta Barclay Paist (1870–1930) was an American artist, designer, teacher, and author. She is perhaps best known for her china painting, a popular turn-of-the-century pastime. Born in Red Wing, Minnesota in 1870, she studied ceramics in Germany, watercolor painting in Minneapolis, and design in Chicago before settling in the Twin Cities, where she also found time to marry and raise a family.

Internationally recognized, Paist won the gold medal in 1896 at Chicago's National Exhibition of Ceramic Workers for a collection of painted porcelain and garnered an award for a portrait on porcelain at the 1900 Paris Exposition. Over her long career, she exhibited work in the Twin Cities, Chicago, New York, and Detroit. Her nineteenth-century pieces, typical of the popular Realistic style, focused on flora and fauna, while her twentieth-century work rendered many of the same subjects in the more stylized manner of the Arts and Crafts movement.

The busy artist also taught at the St. Paul Institute of Arts and Sciences (forerunner of the Science Museum of Minnesota), published watercolor studies and designs for pitchers, vases, and plate borders, and served as a porcelain judge at the Minnesota State Fair for more than twenty years. A member of the Twin City Keramic Club, she was also a frequent contributor and assistant editor of the national magazine for china painters, Keramic Studio. Paist died on February 11, 1930, in Ramsey County.

Notes

References
Paist, Henrietta Barclay. Design and the Decoration of Porcelain. Syracuse, NY: Keramic Studio Publishing Co., [1916].
William and Herbert Paist Papers, 1849–1932; Manuscript Collection, Minnesota Historical Society, St. Paul
"Curator's Choice." Minnesota History 57, no. 7 (Fall 2001): Inside Front.

External links

1870 births
1930 deaths
American watercolorists
American women painters
Painters from Minnesota
People from Red Wing, Minnesota
20th-century American painters
20th-century American women artists
Women watercolorists